Bryan Joseph Watson (November 14, 1942 – July 8, 2021) was a Canadian professional ice hockey defenceman who played 16 seasons in the National Hockey League (NHL).  He played for the Montreal Canadiens, Detroit Red Wings, Oakland Seals, Pittsburgh Penguins, St. Louis Blues, and Washington Capitals from 1963 to 1979, and briefly in the World Hockey Association with the Cincinnati Stingers.  He later served as head coach of the Edmonton Oilers during the 1980–81 NHL season.

Early life
Watson was born in Bancroft, Ontario, on November 14, 1942.  His father was employed by the county; his mother was a housewife.  In order to expand his sporting opportunities, Watson moved to Peterborough, Ontario, when he was 13 to live with his grandparents.  There, he played junior hockey with the Peterborough Petes of the Ontario Hockey Association from 1960 to 1963, under the tutelege of head coach Scotty Bowman.

Playing career

Montreal Canadiens (1963–65)
Watson signed with the Montreal Canadiens and made his NHL debut during the 1963–64 NHL season.  He played in 39 games in the regular season and six games in the opening round of the Stanley Cup playoffs against the Toronto Maple Leafs.  In Watson's second year, he appeared in only five games with Montreal and spent the bulk of the season with the AHL's Quebec Aces, where he played with Doug Harvey.  Watson was traded to the Chicago Blackhawks for Don Johns on June 8, 1965.  He was then claimed the next day by the Detroit Red Wings in the NHL Intra-League Draft.

Detroit Red Wings (1965–67)
During his first year with the Red Wings in 1965–66, Watson played all 70 games in the regular season, during which he scored his first NHL goal and led the team in penalty minutes.  He also appeared in all twelve playoff games for Detroit, scoring two goals – the only playoff goals he scored in his whole career – and helping the Red Wings advance to the Stanley Cup Finals against his former team the Canadiens.  In 1966–67 Watson split his time between the Red Wings and the Memphis Wings, Detroit's farm team in the CPHL.

Montreal Canadiens (1967–68)
Watson was left unprotected by the Red Wings in the 1967 NHL Expansion Draft.  The Minnesota North Stars consequently selected him as their fifteenth pick.  That same day the North Stars traded Watson to Montreal for three young prospects, Bill Plager, Leo Thiffault and Barrie Meissner.  Watson appeared in only a dozen games with the Canadiens in the 1967–68 season, registering just one assist and nine penalty minutes.  He played the rest of the season in the minors, first for the Cleveland Barons in the AHL (12 games) and then the majority of the season with the Houston Apollos in the CPHL.

Oakland Seals and the Pittsburgh Penguins (1968–74)
Watson was traded to the Oakland Seals on June 28, 1968, in exchange for Tom Thurlby and a first round draft pick in 1972.  After playing fifty games for the Seals in the 1968–69 season Watson was sent to the Pittsburgh Penguins in a trade involving six players.  Watson spent most of the next six seasons with the Penguins.  He had the best offensive season of his career in 1971–72, when he scored three goals and twenty points.  He also led the Penguins in penalty minutes in three of his four full seasons with the club, and led the NHL in that statistic with 215 in 1971–72.

Detroit Red Wings (1974–76)
Watson started the 1973–74 season with the Penguins, before being traded to the St. Louis Blues on January 17, 1974.  He played just 11 games with the team before returning to Detroit in a six-player trade less than a month later on February 14.  He accumulated a career-high of 322 penalty minutes in 1975–76, second only to Steve Durbano with 370.  He was also suspended for 10 games that season after fighting with Keith Magnuson of the Chicago Blackhawks on October 30, 1976.

Washington Capitals (1976–79)
Watson was traded to the Washington Capitals for Greg Joly several weeks into the 1976–77 regular season.  In three seasons with the Capitals, he played 155 games and served 294 minutes in penalties.  Watson received the Charlie Conacher Humanitarian Award in 1978 for his contributions to the Special Olympics.  He sustained a serious cut to his right arm from a chainsaw in July 1978, while assisting his neighbour in chopping down a tree.  However, he avoided long-term injury due to the uncommon nerve structure in his arm.  During the 1978–79 regular season, he left the NHL to join the Cincinnati Stingers of the World Hockey Association, with whom he ended his playing career.

Coaching career
Watson was appointed head coach of the Edmonton Oilers in 1980, at the start of the franchise's second season in the NHL, replacing Glen Sather who was promoted to President and General Manager. However, when the team posted a record of four wins, nine losses and five ties to start the season, Watson was demoted to an assistant by Sather, who resumed head coaching duties. Watson left the team after the season and never returned to coaching.

Personal life and death
Watson was married to Lindy Wilson for 53 years until his death.  Together, they had two children: Stephen and Lisa.  Watson and Lindy opened an Armand's pizza outlet in the Old Town section of Alexandria, Virginia, a suburb of Washington, D.C. in 1983.  Fifteen years later, the business's name was changed to Bugsy's, his nickname during his playing years.  Watson sold his interest in the business in 2013.

During the 1980s, Watson kept on playing hockey in an over-40 league in Mount Vernon.

Watson died on July 8, 2021, at his home in St. Michaels, Maryland.  He was 78, and suffered from pneumonia prior to his death.

Career statistics
Sources:

Coaching record

Source:

See also
 List of NHL players with 2000 career penalty minutes

References

External links

1942 births
2021 deaths
Baltimore Clippers players
Cincinnati Stingers players
Deaths from pneumonia in Maryland
Detroit Red Wings players
Edmonton Oilers coaches
Houston Apollos players
Ice hockey people from Ontario
Montreal Canadiens players
Oakland Seals players
People from Hastings County
Pittsburgh Penguins players
St. Louis Blues players
Stanley Cup champions
Washington Capitals players
Canadian ice hockey defencemen
Canadian ice hockey coaches